Osie Leon Wood III (born March 25, 1962), is an American former professional basketball player.  A college All-American, he was a first round NBA draft pick, and both an Olympic and Pan-Am Games gold-medalist. He subsequently has had a career as an NBA referee.

Career
A 6'3" point guard from Saint Monica Catholic High School, Wood was an All-American at California State University-Fullerton.  He was selected by the Philadelphia 76ers as the 10th pick in the first round of the 1984 NBA draft and played in six NBA seasons for six different teams: the 76ers, Washington Bullets, New Jersey Nets, San Antonio Spurs, Atlanta Hawks and Sacramento Kings.

In his NBA career, Wood played in 274 games and scored a total of 1,742 points (6.4 points per game). He was a contestant in the first NBA 3-point shootout at the All-Star Weekend in Dallas in 1987. Wood had a short European professional league stint in Germany for MTV 1846 Giessen, where he was signed for the playoffs and appeared in three games, scoring a total of 77 points. He also played for CAI Zaragoza (ACB League) in the 1988–1989 season. Wood played four seasons in the Continental Basketball Association, averaging 18.1 points and 8.5 assists in 118 games, being named second-team All-CBA in 1990. Wood last played professional basketball in the Philippine Basketball Association in 1994, where he led the Purefoods franchise to a semifinal finish.

Wood is a two-time International gold-medalist, winning at the 1983 Pan American Games and as a member of the 1984 U.S. Olympic basketball team coached by Bobby Knight. Wood averaged 7.9 assists to lead the 1984 Olympic team.

He became an NBA official in 1996 and is in his 25th season as a referee in 2020-21.

Other facts 
Wood filed lawsuit against NBA for violations of anti-trust laws. Both District Court and Court of Appeals for the Second Circuit ruled in favor of NBA.

References

External links

Italian League stats
"Wood Sues NBA" @ New York Times

1962 births
Living people
20th-century African-American sportspeople
21st-century African-American people
African-American basketball players
African-American sports officials
All-American college men's basketball players
American expatriate basketball people in France
American expatriate basketball people in Germany
American expatriate basketball people in Italy
American expatriate basketball people in the Philippines
American expatriate basketball people in Spain
American men's basketball players
Arizona Wildcats men's basketball players
Atlanta Hawks players
Basket CRO Lyon players
Basketball players at the 1983 Pan American Games
Basketball players at the 1984 Summer Olympics
Basketball players from Columbia, South Carolina
Cal State Fullerton Titans men's basketball players
CB Zaragoza players
Continental Basketball Association referees
Fargo-Moorhead Fever players
Giessen 46ers players
Juvecaserta Basket players
Liga ACB players
Magnolia Hotshots players
Medalists at the 1983 Pan American Games
Medalists at the 1984 Summer Olympics
National Basketball Association referees
New Jersey Nets players
Olympic gold medalists for the United States in basketball
Pan American Games gold medalists for the United States
Pan American Games medalists in basketball
Parade High School All-Americans (boys' basketball)
Philadelphia 76ers draft picks
Philadelphia 76ers players
Philippine Basketball Association imports
Point guards
Rapid City Thrillers players
Sacramento Kings players
San Antonio Spurs players
Santa Barbara Islanders players
Shooting guards
United States men's national basketball team players
Washington Bullets players